Margriet is a Dutch weekly magazine for women of all ages, which publishes articles on fashion, beauty, health, nutrition, relationships, and society. Formerly published by Verenigde Nederlandse Uitgeverijen, it is owned and published by Sanoma after the latter took over VNU's magazine division.

Established in 1938, Margriet was at one point the women's magazine with the highest circulation in the country, when it was read by more than a million women every week. For the first four years it was written almost in its entirety by one woman, Alma van Eysden-Peeren. During the late 1960s the magazine, influenced by feminism, became well known for its incorporation of emancipatory content (sometimes controversially so). Its polls among women readers asked questions that at the time were groundbreaking for such a mainstream, large-circulation magazine and it participated in feminist action.

History

First decades: 1938 - 1960s
The magazine's first issue appeared on 30 September 1938, and was published by the Geïllustreerde Pers. The "weekly for women and girls" was at first an appendix for the family magazine De week in beeld, and was not published independently until 1942. The name's origin ("Margriet" is both a girl's and a flower's name in Dutch) is unknown.

For its first four years, Margriet was the creation of one single woman, Alma van Eysden-Peeren; occasionally she wrote content under the pseudonym Els van Duin, to give the impression that there was a staff of writers and editors. While she wrote the entire magazine, she was never in charge; until the early 1960s the editor-in-chief was Anton Weehuizen, also editor-in-chief of the Geïllustreerde Pers. Van Eysden-Peeren was active with the magazine until the 1960s, and she was a longtime respondent for the advice column "Margriet weet raad". Initially Margriet was sober and simple: published in black and white and of modest length, it already featured the content that was to be its success formula for years to come: recipes, articles on child care and motherhood, sewing patterns, letters and questions to the editors, interviews, and regular columns.

In April 1943, during World War II, the German occupiers closed down the magazine. Margriet survived the war and resumed publication in November 1945, with Princess Margriet of the Netherlands on the cover of the first new issue. The magazine returned to weekly publication in 1949, and in 1948 incorporated the magazine Moeder en kind ("mother and child") and in  1950 Cinderella. The first issue of Donald Duck, a weekly comic book with Disney characters, was distributed free with Margriet on 25 October 1952.

The magazine's biggest growth took place in this period, between 1949 and 1953; around 1950 it had some 500,000 subscribers. Until the mid-1960s it remained mainstream, and was characterized by modesty, deference, and a sense of duty.

Emancipation: 1960s - 1970s
Under a new editor, Joop Swart, Margriet acquired a more journalistic character in the mid-1960s, a time of increased wealth and socio-economic changes in the country. By 1965, it reached the height of its circulation, with 800,000 paying subscribers. In the second half of the 1960s, the magazine held a series of reader polls that aimed to give insight into the private life of the Dutch. By the late 1960s Margriet (as well as other women's magazines such as Libelle) started publishing articles and series reflective of the changing roles for women in society; an emancipatory series in 1967, for instance, called "Tomorrow's woman", was justified by reference to the revolutionary times. The feminist group Dolle Mina, however, was dissatisfied, and considered the magazine still too old-fashioned and conformist. On 20 February 1970 they occupied the publisher's headquarters, bringing cleaning supplies to clean the offices since, they claimed, that was all women were supposed to do according to the magazine. In truth, Margriet was much more progressive than it was given credit for and could be considered a proto-Opzij; in 1969, for instance, it had held and published a survey about sexuality, "Sex in Nederland" (one of its conclusions was that 60,000 married women had homosexual feelings,) and had begun publishing articles on emancipation and other modern topics.

The magazine took the initiative for a large-scale feminist event, November 1970's Op de vrouw af!, which it organized with a number of other organizations, most notably the feminist group Man Vrouw Maatschappij, but also Dolle Mina—a later poll showed that most people believed it was a Dolle Mina event. It published articles arguing the need for free and legal abortion, which caused the Secretary of Health to call the editor-in-chief into his office, since articles with such content, he explained, were to appear in medical journals only. In 1972 it became the first Dutch magazine with a woman as editor-in-chief, when Hanny van den Horst, who had been with the magazine since 1945, was appointed to the position. In 1978 it was awarded the LOF award from the Lucas-Ooms Fonds, an award for "exceptional contributions in magazines and magazine journalism"; the magazine, according to the foundation, was the only one that supported emancipation to a broad segment of the population.

Decline: 1980s - 2010s 
The 1980s and 1990s saw Margriet readership diminishing. Its content changed somewhat also, as a 1982 study of Margriet and Libelle indicated: whereas in the 1960s the magazine's focus in the area of motherhood had been on "servitude and sacrifice", and in the 1970s on the child's education, the 1980s saw that focus shift toward the mother (and her self-development) rather than the child, and more attention was paid to the role of the father. In the 1990s, women's magazines were less focused on motherhood. Since the early 1990s its circulation has shrunk even more, as has that of Libelle, though the two remain the largest of the popular subscription magazines.

In 2000 the circulation of Margriet was 426,135 copies. The magazine had a circulation of 423,631 copies in 2003.

Margriet has occasional special issues, one of which was devoted to the Prime Minister Mark Rutte in October 2015.

Notable writers and columnists

Wina Born, culinary journalist, who had a column in Margriet since 1959 
 Hedy d'Ancona
 Mies Bouwman
 Liesbeth den Uyl
 Mat Heffels
 Walty Dudok van Heel

Editors-in-chief 

 A.J.A.M. Weehuizen 1938 – 1970
 Joop Swart 1970 – 1972
 Hanny van den Horst 1972 – 1981
 Winnie van Rossem 1981 – 1987
 Renie van Wijk 1987 – 1988 (interim)
 Rob van Vuure 1988 – 1991
 Aty Luitze 1991 – 1999
 Rob van Vuure 1999 – 2001
 Anneliese Bergman 2001 - 2008
 Leontine van den Bos 2008 – present

References

Bibliography

External links
 

1938 establishments in the Netherlands
Dutch-language magazines
Feminism in the Netherlands
Feminist magazines
Magazines established in 1938
Magazines published in Amsterdam
Weekly magazines published in the Netherlands
Women's magazines published in the Netherlands